The prime minister of Morocco (officially Head of Government) is the head of government of the Kingdom of Morocco. The prime minister is chosen by the king of Morocco from the largest party elected to parliament. The Constitution of Morocco grants executive powers to the government and allows the head of government to propose and dismiss cabinet members, provincial governors, and ambassadors, to oversee government programs and the delivery of public services, and to dissolve the lower house of parliament with the king's approval.

A newly appointed prime minister is responsible for forming the government it will head by leading negotiations between the king and parliament to fill ministry positions. Until the new government is approved by the king and formally takes office, parliament approves and oversees government programs and public service. There are no constitutional limits on a prime minister's term, and several have served multiple non-consecutive terms.

Contrary to typical presidential systems where the president is the highest ranking leader of the executive branch and is considered both head of government and head of state, the king is the Moroccan head of state and holds substantial discretionary power over the executive branch and has exclusive authority over the military, religion, and the judiciary.

The current holder is Aziz Akhannouch since taking office on 7 October 2021 from Othmani.

History 
On 20 September 2007, Abbas El Fassi was appointed 14th Prime Minister of Morocco by King Mohammed VI.

On 29 November 2011, Abdelilah Benkirane was appointed 15th Prime Minister of Morocco by King Mohammed VI. On 10 October 2016, Bankirane was reappointed after the Islamist party won parliamentary elections. He was dismissed on 15 March 2017 by King Mohammed VI, due to failure to form a government five months after elections.

On 17 March 2017, Saadeddine Othmani was appointed 16th Prime Minister of Morocco by King Mohammed VI.

On 10 September 2021, Aziz Akhannouch was appointed 17th Prime Minister of Morocco by King Mohammed VI.

List of prime ministers

See also
Politics of Morocco

References

 
1955 establishments in Morocco
Politics of Morocco
Government of Morocco